Calaveras Hills High School (CHHS) is one of the two high schools of Milpitas, California. Calaveras Hills High School works with students who need an alternative form of education.  Calaveras Hills High is referred to as "Cal Hills" by students and the community. Cal Hills is the most successful alternative school in the state. Test scores for the STAR test rose hundreds of points from 500+ to 714. Cal Hills often has a waiting list to get into the program.

Cal Hills has a very successful Resource Special Education program that has helped hundreds of under performing students achieve high school graduate. Students have won many local scholarships and awards while graduating from this program. Cal Hills has earned the highest WASC accreditation and is a Dist. School (Model school).  Cal Hills has won many league championships against rivals Alta Vista and Robertson.
  
Past principals include Fleming Matson, Don Denton, Mike Madalinski, Paul Cauchi, Michael Hermosillo, Katie Martinez, and Alecia Myers. The Current superintendent is Cary Matsuoka.

References

Buildings and structures in Milpitas, California
Schools accredited by the Western Association of Schools and Colleges
High schools in Santa Clara County, California
Continuation high schools in California
Public high schools in California